An untitled Grand Theft Auto game is in development by Rockstar Games. It is due to be the eighth main Grand Theft Auto game, following Grand Theft Auto V (2013), and the sixteenth instalment overall. Following years of speculation and leaks, Rockstar confirmed in February 2022 that the game is in development. Footage from unfinished versions leaked online in September in what was described as one of the biggest leaks in the history of the video game industry.

Development 
Following the release of Grand Theft Auto V in September 2013, Rockstar North president Leslie Benzies said the company had "some ideas" for the next entry in the series. In March 2018, The Know reported the game, code-named Project Americas, would be set primarily in a reworked Vice City and partly in South America, with a female playable protagonist. In April 2020, Kotakus Jason Schreier reported the game was "early in development" as "a moderately sized release" that would expand over time, to avoid the developer crunch of its predecessors. In July 2021, journalist Tom Henderson claimed the game would be set in modern-day Vice City, its map could evolve akin to Fortnite, and it would not release until 2025; Schreier reaffirmed these reports. Writing for Bloomberg News in July 2022, Schreier reported the game, titled Grand Theft Auto VI, entered development in 2014 and would feature a pair of protagonists influenced by Bonnie and Clyde, including a Latina woman; he claimed the developers were cautiously subverting the series' trend of joking about marginalised groups.

In the years before its announcement, a new Grand Theft Auto game became highly anticipated, and journalists noted some fans had become frustrated by Rockstar Games's continued silence, particularly after they announced a re-release of Grand Theft Auto V in 2020. On 4 February 2022, Rockstar confirmed development was "well underway", and they intended to "significantly move beyond what we have previously delivered". In July, Rockstar announced Red Dead Online would not receive more major updates as development resources were withdrawn to focus on the upcoming game; industry sources stated Rockstar reallocated resources after planned remasters of Grand Theft Auto IV (2008) and Red Dead Redemption (2010) were paused due to the backlash received by Grand Theft Auto: The Trilogy – The Definitive Edition (2021). In August, Strauss Zelnick, chief executive officer of Rockstar's parent company Take-Two Interactive, said Rockstar was "determined to once again set creative benchmarks for the series, our industry, and for all entertainment".

Leak 
On 18 September 2022, 90 videos showing 50 minutes of work-in-progress game footage were leaked to GTAForums by a user known as "teapotuberhacker". Schreier confirmed with sources at Rockstar that the footage was genuine, and The Guardian reported it was from several stages of development, with some videos about a year old. The footage reveals a modern-day Vice City setting, contains animation tests, gameplay tests, level layouts, and conversations between characters, and depicts the player characters, Jason and Lucia, entering a strip club and robbing a diner. The hacker claimed to be behind the Uber security breach from the earlier week. They claimed to have downloaded the files directly from Rockstar's internal Slack groups, and they possessed source code, assets, and internal builds of both the new game and Grand Theft AutoV, which they threatened to publish.

Take-Two responded by submitting takedowns of videos showing or discussing the leaks hosted on YouTube under the Digital Millennium Copyright Act, and contacted moderators of GTAForums and Reddit to remove access. The hacker wrote they were "looking to negotiate a deal" with Rockstar or Take-Two. Several journalists described the event as one of the biggest leaks in video game history; Schreier called it "a nightmare for Rockstar Games" that could limit remote work flexibility for employees. Jefferies analyst Andrew Uerkwitz called it a "PR disaster" that could potentially delay the game and diminish staff morale, but was unlikely to impact reception or sales. The Guardian noted the leaked footage was being widely criticised "by ill-informed users" due to its quality, despite not being representative of the final product. Some users erroneously claimed graphics and art assets are finalised early in game development. In solidarity, many industry developers shared work-in-progress footage of their games and some, including Cliff Bleszinski, Neil Druckmann, Rami Ismail, and Alanah Pearce, offered their sympathies to Rockstar.

On 19 September, Rockstar confirmed the leak to be a "network intrusion" and lamented how the game was first demonstrated but did not anticipate long-term effects on development. Rockstar locked comments and replies on their social media accounts in the days following the leak. Take-Two added that steps had been taken "to isolate and contain this incident". The company's share price dropped by more than six per cent in pre-market trading that day, but recovered during regular trading hours following Take-Two's statement. Uber acknowledged the potential links to their security breach and noted they were working with the Federal Bureau of Investigation and the United States Department of Justice. They believed the hacker was affiliated with the group Lapsus$, which is thought to have breached companies such as Microsoft, Nvidia, and Samsung over the preceding year. In November, Zelnick said no material assets appeared to have been taken and the incident caused the companies to become more vigilant with cybersecurity. In February 2023, he reiterated the leak had impacted staff emotionally but business remained unaffected.

A 17-year-old boy from Oxfordshire—claimed by The Desk Matthew Keys to be "teapotuberhacker"—was arrested by the City of London Police on 22 September as part of an investigation supported by the National Cyber Crime Unit of the United Kingdom's National Crime Agency. According to Keys, federal law enforcement officials from the United States assisted the investigation, and at least two other people are understood to be involved. The suspect is believed to be one of the leaders of Lapsus$ who, then aged 16, was among the seven arrested in March 2022 under suspicion of hacking several other companies, during which he accumulated . Appearing before the Highbury Corner Youth Court on 24 September, he was charged with two counts of breach of bail conditions and two counts of computer misuse; he pleaded guilty to the former and not guilty to the latter, denying the prosecutor's claims that he used a mobile phone he "didn't have permission to have" to hack and ransom companies. The case was referred to a higher court alongside a "similar" matter while the boy was remanded to a youth detention centre.

Notes

References 

Data breaches
Grand Theft Auto
Hacking in the 2020s
G